Padmavathi Temple is the temple dedicated to Goddess Padmavathi or Alamelumanga, the consort of Lord Venkateswara. The temple is under the administration of Tirumala Tirupati Devasthanams.

Legend 

It is believed that the Goddess Lakshmi was born as Alamelu to Akasha Raja, the ruler of this region, and wed Venkateshwara of Tirupati. Goddess Lakshmi gave darshan to Lord Venkateswara on a red Lotus flower (Padma in Sanskrit) at Alamelu mangapuram after his deep penance for twelve years.
According to tradition, the Mother Goddess manifested Herself in the holy Pushkarini called Padmasarovaram in a golden lotus. The Venkatachala Mahatyam states that Lord Suryanarayana was instrumental in blossoming of the lotus in full splendour. A temple dedicated to Lord Suryanarayana is situated on the eastern side of the Pushkarini. The Padma Purana gives a vivid description of the advent of the Goddess and subsequent wedding with Lord Srinivasa. The manifestation of Sri Padmavathi Devi occurred in the month of Karthika on Sukla Paksha Panchami when the star Uttarashada in the ascendent. The Brahmotsavam of the Goddess is celebrated with all pomp and glory to commemorate the auspicious occasion of Her avatara.

Deity 
Padmavathi (or Alamelumanga) is the main deity of the temple. Padmavathi is the incarnation of goddess Lakshmi and is consort of Lord Venkateswara. The deity is facing towards east.

Padmasarovaram 
Padmasarovaram is the Temple tank of Sri Padmavathi Temple. It is believed that Goddess Padmavathi manifested in this Tank in golden Lotus flower (padmam) on ‘Sukla Paksha Panchami’ day in the Kartheeka masam.

Festivals 
In Padmasarovaram, Chakra Snanam will be held on last day of Annual Padmavathi Brahmotsavams (Panchami Teertham) which will witness lakhs of Devotees taking a dip in the holy waters.

Other Temples in Complex 

Sri Krishna Swamy Temple and Sri Sundararaja Swamy Temple are sub-temples within the Padmavathi Temple. Sri Krishna Swamy Temple is the earliest of the temples inside the temple complex. As per evidence this temple came into existence in the 1221 AD. Sri Sundararajaswamy Temple came into existence into 16th Century and is dedicated to Sri Varadaraja Swamy and his consorts Sridevi and Bhudevi. There is also a temple dedicated to Lord Suryanarayana opposite to Padmasarovaram (Temple Tank). This deity of this temple is believed to installed by Lord Venkateswara.

See also 
 Tirumala Venkateswara Temple
 Goddess Lakshmi
 List of temples under Tirumala Tirupati Devasthanams
 Tirupati

References

External links 
 
 Sri Padmavathi Ammavari Temple

Tirupati
Buildings and structures in Tirupati
Hindu pilgrimage sites in India
Hindu temples in Tirupati district
Tirumala Tirupati Devasthanams
Devi temples in Andhra Pradesh